Tripartite motif-containing 28 (TRIM28), also known as transcriptional intermediary factor 1β (TIF1β) and KAP1 (KRAB-associated protein-1), is a protein that in humans is encoded by the TRIM28 gene.

Function 
The protein encoded by this gene mediates transcriptional control by interaction with the Krüppel-associated box repression domain found in many transcription factors. The protein localizes to the nucleus and is thought to associate with specific chromatin regions. The protein is a member of the tripartite motif family. This tripartite motif includes three zinc-binding domains, a RING, a B-box type 1 and a B-box type 2, and a coiled-coil region.

KAP1 is a ubiquitously expressed protein involved in many critical functions including: transcriptional regulation, cellular differentiation and proliferation, DNA damage repair, viral suppression, and apoptosis. Its functionality is dependent upon post-translational modifications. Sumoylated TRIM28 can assemble epigenetic machinery for gene silencing, while phosphorylated TRIM28 is involved in DNA repair.

Cellular differentiation and proliferation 

Studies have shown that deletion of KAP1 in mice before gastrulation results in death (implicating it as a necessary protein for proliferation) while deletion in adult mice results in increased anxiety and stress-induced alterations in learning and memory.  KAP1 has been shown to participate in the maintenance of pluripotency of embryonic stem cells and to promote and inhibit cellular differentiation of adult cell lines.  Increased levels of KAP1 have been found in liver, gastric, breast, lung, and prostate cancers as well, indicating that it may play an important role in tumor cell proliferation (possibly by inhibiting apoptosis).

Transcriptional regulation 

KAP1 can regulate genomic transcription through a variety of mechanisms, many of which remain somewhat unclear.  Studies have shown that KAP1 can repress transcription by binding directly to the genome (which can be sufficient in and of itself) or through the induction of heterochromatin formation via the Mi2α-SETB1-HP1 macromolecular complex.  KAP1 can also interact with histone methyltransferases and deacetylases via the C-terminal PHD and Bromodomain to control transcription epigenetically.

DNA damage repair response 

It has been shown that ATM phosphorylates KAP1 upon the discovery of damaged or broken DNA.  Phosphorylated KAP1, along with many other DNA damage proteins, rapidly migrate to the site of the DNA damage.  Its exact involvement in this pathway is somewhat unclear, but it has been implicated in triggering cell arrest, allowing for the damaged DNA to be repaired.

Apoptosis 

KAP1 forms a complex with MDM2 (a ubiquitin E3 ligase) that binds to p53.  The complex marks the bound p53 for degradation.  p53 is a known precursor of apoptosis that facilitates the synthesis of proteins necessary for cell death so its degradation results in apoptosis inhibition.

Clinical significance

Role in the establishment of viral latency 

KAP1 facilitates the establishment of viral latency in certain cell types for Human Cytomegalovirus (HCMV) and other endogenous retroviruses
.  KAP1 acts as a transcriptional corepressor of the viral genome.  The protein binds to the histones of the viral chromatin and then recruits Mi2α and SETB1.  SETB1 is a histone methyltransferase that recruits HP1, thus inducing heterochromatin formation.  This heterochromatin formation prevents the transcription of the viral genome.  mTOR has been implicated in the phosphorylation of KAP1 resulting in a switch from latency to the lytic cycle.

Manipulations and potential for future treatment 

Ataxia telangiectasia mutated (ATM) is a kinase that (similar to mTOR) can phosphorylate KAP1 resulting in the switch from viral latency to the lytic cycle.  Chloroquine (an ATM) activator has been shown to result in increases in transcription of the HCMV genome.  This effect is augmented by the use of tumor necrosis factor    It has been proposed that this treatment (accompanied by antiretroviral treatment) has the potential to purge the virus from infected individuals.

Interactions 

TRIM28 has been shown to interact with:

 CBX5, 
 CEBPB, 
 Glucocorticoid receptor,
 SETDB1  and
 ZNF10.

See also 
 Transcription coregulator

References

Further reading

External links 
 
 
 
 
 

Gene expression
Transcription coregulators